The Copley baronetcy was first created for Godfrey Copley on 17 June 1661. He was High Sheriff of Yorkshire for 1676–77.

His son Sir Godfrey Copley, 2nd Baronet, High Sheriff for 1677 and whose bequest to the Royal Society financed the Copley Medal, left no male heir and the first creation of the baronetcy thereby became extinct. His daughter Catherine married Joseph Moyle, the second son of Sir Walter Moyle of Beke, Cornwall. Their son Joseph Moyle, who was Clerk of the Signet, changed his surname to Copley by Act of Parliament on inheriting the Sprotbrough estate in 1766 and was created a baronet in 1778.

Copley baronets of Sprotbrough, Yorks
(17 June 1661 creation in the Baronetage of England)

Sir Godfrey Copley, 1st Baronet (21 February 1623 – 21 February 1678)
Sir Godfrey Copley, 2nd Baronet ( – 9 Apr 1709) – FRS, MP for Aldborough 1679–1685 and Thirsk 1695–1709
Extinct on his death

Copley baronets of Sprotbrough, Yorks
(28 August 1778 creation in the Baronetage of Great Britain)

Sir Joseph Copley, 1st Baronet (died 11 Apr 1781) – born Joseph Moyle and changed his name on inheriting Sprotbrough.
Sir Lionel Copley, 2nd Baronet (c. 1767 – 4 March 1806) –  MP for Tregony 1796–1802
Sir Joseph Copley, 3rd Baronet (c. 1769 – 21 May 1838)
Sir Joseph William Copley, 4th Baronet (27 July 1804 – 4 January 1883)
Extinct on his death

References

Extinct baronetcies in the Baronetage of England
Extinct baronetcies in the Baronetage of Great Britain
1661 establishments in England